Athetis satellitia is a moth of the family Noctuidae. This species is known from Eritrea, Somalia, South Africa, Mozambique, Zambia, Congo and Madagascar.

The female of this moth is greyish brown, head whitish. Forewings with white points on the costa at the lines, white points in cell before and in the middle. Hindwings are pale strongly suffused with brown the cilia ochreous at the tips.
The wingspan is approx. 32 mm.

References

Moths described in 1902
Acronictinae
Moths of Africa
Moths of Madagascar